Palaestina Salutaris or Palaestina Tertia was a Byzantine (Eastern Roman) province, which covered the area of the Negev, Sinai (except the north western coast) and south-west of Transjordan, south of the Dead Sea. The province, a part of the Diocese of the East, was split from Arabia Petraea during the reforms of Diocletian in c.300 CE, and existed until the Muslim Arab conquests of the 7th century.

Background 
In 106, the territories east of Damascus and south to the Red Sea were annexed from the Nabataean kingdom and reformed into the province of Arabia with a capital Petra and Bostra (north and south). The province was enlarged by Septimius Severus in 195, and is believed to have split into two provinces: Arabia Minor or Arabia Petraea and Arabia Maior, both subject to imperial legates ranking as consularis, each with a legion.

By the 3rd century, the Nabataeans had stopped writing in Aramaic and begun writing in Greek instead, and by the 4th century they had partially converted to Christianity, a process completed in the 5th century.

Petra declined rapidly under late Roman rule, in large part from the revision of sea-based trade routes. In 363 an earthquake destroyed many buildings, and crippled the vital water management system.

The area became organized under late Roman Empire as part of the Diocese of the East (314), in which it was included together with the provinces of Isauria, Cilicia, Cyprus (until 536), Euphratensis, Mesopotamia, Osroene, Phoenice and Arabia Petraea.

Byzantine rule in the 4th century introduced Christianity to the population. Agricultural-based cities were established and the population grew exponentially. Under Byzantium (since 390), a new subdivision did further split the province of Cilicia into Cilicia Prima, Cilicia Secunda; Syria Palaestina was split into Syria Prima, Syria Salutaris, Phoenice Lebanensis, Palaestina Prima, Palaestina Secunda and eventually also Palaestina Salutaris (in 6th century).

History 

Palaestina Tertia included the Negev, southern Transjordan, once part of Arabia Petraea, and most of Sinai with Petra as the usual residence of the governor and Metropolitan Archbishopric. Palestina Tertia was also known as Palaestina Salutaris. According to historian H.H. Ben-Sasson,

The Muslim Arabs found the remnants of the Nabataeans of Transjordan and the Negev transformed into peasants. Their lands were divided between the new Qahtanite Arab tribal kingdoms of the Byzantine vassals, the Ghassanid Arabs and the Himyarite vassals, the Kinda Arab Kingdom in North Arabia, forming parts of the Bilad al-Sham province.

See also 
 Hauara
 Palaestina Prima
 Palaestina Secunda

References 

States and territories established in the 300s
6th-century establishments in the Byzantine Empire
7th-century disestablishments in Asia
Classical Palestine
History of Jordan
Holy Land during Byzantine rule
Israel in the Roman era
Judea
Late Roman provinces
Political entities in the Land of Israel
Provinces of the Byzantine Empire
Sinai Peninsula
States and territories disestablished in the 7th century
Transjordan (region)